Ruth Achieng is a Ugandan politician. She was appointed, but she never served as, State Minister for Fisheries in the Cabinet of Uganda on 6 June 2016, replacing Zerubabel Nyiira. Ruth Achieng served in the 9th Parliament (2011–2016) as the Kole District Woman Representative before losing in the 2016 election cycle. Her name was withdrawn at the last minute and she was not vetted by the parliamentary appointments committee, resulting in her not being sworn in on 22 June 2016.

See also
 Parliament of Uganda

References

Living people
Kole District
Members of the Parliament of Uganda
Government ministers of Uganda
People from Northern Region, Uganda
Year of birth missing (living people)
21st-century Ugandan women politicians
21st-century Ugandan politicians